A statue of Johannes Gutenberg is installed on the Stanford University campus in Stanford, California, United States.

History
The original marble by Italian sculptor Antonio Frilli was removed in 1949, along with another by Frilli depicting Benjamin Franklin. The two statues were replaced by new sculptures by Palo Alto artist Oleg Lobykin in 2013. The statues of Franklin and Gutenberg were installed on perches on the exterior of Wallenberg Hall.

See also

 2013 in art

References

2013 establishments in California
2013 sculptures
Marble sculptures in the United States
Outdoor sculptures in California
Sculptures of men in California
Johannes Gutenberg
Stanford University buildings and structures